ENS Al-Galala (FFG 1002) is a FREMM multipurpose frigate of the Egyptian Navy. Al-Galala was originally constructed as the Carlo Bergamini-class Spartaco Schergat before being acquired by Egypt and being renamed.

Development and design 
Three original variants of the FREMM were proposed; an anti-submarine variant (ASW) and a general-purpose variant (GP) and a land-attack variant (AVT) to replace the existing classes of frigates within the French and Italian navies. A total of 27 FREMM were to be constructed - 17 for France and 10 for Italy - with additional aims to seek exports, however budget cuts and changing requirements has seen this number drop significantly for France, while the order for Italy remained unchanged. The land-attack variant (AVT) was subsequently cancelled.

In 2020 and 2021 it was reported that Italy would sell all its FREMM-class frigates in the current production line (Spartaco Schergat and Emilio Bianchi) to Egypt. Spartaco Schergat was in the final stage of her sea trials while Emilio Bianchi would follow within one year. The deal reportedly also involved other military equipment and was worth 1.2 billion Euros.

Some sensitive equipment was deleted from the original Italian design, including the EW suite’s jammers, NETTUNO-4100 RECM system and Thales Altesse CESM equipment. SATCOM antennas were also removed from the communication suite.

Construction and career 
On 26 January 2019, the launching ceremony of the ship took place at the Fincantieri plants in Riva Trigoso. On December 31, Al-Galala arrived at Alexandria's naval base after Italy finished training the Egyptian crew on operating the ship, and it was ready for service. Al-Galala can provide protection to Egyptian economic sites like Zohr Field, and other fields in the Mediterranean or the red sea. It's also capable for anti submarine warfare, and anti ship warfare. It was reported that Italy would then order two additional FREMM frigates to replace those transferred to Egypt with the anticipated delivery of the replacements by 2024.

References 

Ships built by Fincantieri 
2019 ships 
Ships built in Italy
Bergamini-class frigates (2011)
Frigates of the Egyptian Navy